Frederic Percy Harton  (10 June 18893 November 1958) was an Anglican priest and author during the twentieth century. He was the husband of writer Sibyl Harton.

He trained for the priesthood at King's College, London (spending time at Bishop's College, Cheshunt); and ordained Deacon in  1913 and Priest in 1914. After curacies in Hornsey and Stroud Green he was Vicar of Ardeley from 1922 to 1926. He was at St Paul, Colombo from 1926 to 1927 then Warden of the Sisters of Charity, Knowle, Bristol. He was then Vicar of Baulking from 1936 to 1951.

Later he served as Dean of Wells (1951–1958). He is known essentially for a frequently republished guide to the spiritual life addressed to an Anglican readership but drawing significantly on seventeenth and eighteenth century French and Italian Catholic works of spiritual direction.

References

External links 

1889 births
1958 deaths
Alumni of the Theological Department of King's College London
Associates of King's College London
Alumni of Bishops' College, Cheshunt
Holders of a Lambeth degree
Deans of Wells
English Anglo-Catholics
English Anglican theologians
Anglo-Catholic theologians
Anglo-Catholic clergy
20th-century English theologians
20th-century English Anglican priests